Released in July 2009, The Carte Noire Readers is a series of online Jackanory style films promoting the French coffee brand Carte Noire. It stars British actors Dominic West, Greg Wise and Dan Stevens reading love scenes from a variety of classic and modern Penguin novels.

In March 2010 a new series was released featuring Joseph Fiennes to celebrate the launch of Carte Noire's new cappuccino product. The 10 films were released over a series of weeks, beginning with readings of Sense and Sensibility by Jane Austen, The Brightest Star in the Sky by Marian Keyes and Presumed Innocent by Scott Turow.

Readings
Pride and Prejudice by Jane Austen read by Dominic West
Tess of the d'Urbervilles by Thomas Hardy read by Greg Wise
Great Expectations by Charles Dickens read by Dan Stevens
High Fidelity by Nick Hornby read by Dominic West
A Guide to the Birds of East Africa by Nicholas Drayson read by Greg Wise
Lady Chatterley's Lover by D. H. Lawrence read by Dominic West
The Rotters' Club by Jonathan Coe read by Dan Stevens
Sense and Sensibility by Jane Austen read by Joseph Fiennes
The Brightest Star in the Sky by Marian Keyes read by Joseph Fiennes
Presumed Innocent by Scott Turow read by Joseph Fiennes

References

External links
 The Carte Noire Readers

Advertising campaigns